A vimpa (plural: vimpae) is a veil or shawl worn over the shoulders of servers who carry the mitre and crosier during liturgical functions when they are not being used by the bishop, in the Roman Catholic, Anglican, and some other western churches.

Function 
The vimpa is used to hold the mitre or crosier, thus preventing direct contact with the pontificalia by anyone other than the bishop.  The two vimpa-bearers attend the bishop during Pontifical Mass, and follow him in procession.

Design 

The vimpa may take the form of a cape-like shawl or a many-pleated scarf, with a base colour usually of either white or silver. A vimpa can be a simple white/silver veil or can be fashioned with one or many liturgical symbols, such as crosses. The vimpa can hang on the mitre- and crosier-bearers' shoulders or be secured in the front by velcro, ribbon or even clasps. They can end as short as the server's waist, and as long as the server's feet.

Due to its form, many people often mistake the vimpa for a humeral veil which is used to hold a monstrance during liturgical functions like Benediction.

Other uses 
The term is also used to refer to the attendants themselves, when the plural form vimpas is usually used. The term 'vimpa-boys' is sometimes heard, being derived from the historical fact that in many churches the altar servers (and therefore the vimpa-bearers) were young boys. A vimpa is occasionally used in the Anglican liturgy in an alternative function, when the crosier is carried before the bishop in procession, often by a junior Clerk in Holy Orders.

See also 
Humeral veil
Pontifical

References

External links
 Catholic ceremonies

Roman Catholic vestments
Anglican vestments
Catholic liturgy